B-Movie Matinee is the second solo studio album by American R&B guitarist, producer and founder of band Chic, Nile Rodgers. As with his first album, it failed to make the Billboard 200 (its highest position was bubbling under at 206). Although a single “Let’s Go Out Tonight” remains Rodgers’ only solo single to make the Billboard Hot 100 reaching number 88. Both “Let’s Go Out Tonight” and “State Your Mind” had promotional videos made for their single release.
 
“Stay Out Of The Light” contains samples from "Raiders of the Lost Ark", "stop ... stay out of the light", "throw me the whip", "adios señor" and "I'll show you what I'm accustomed to, Dr. Jones".

Cover
The album featured a 3D cover, designed by Mick Haggerty. Both the original vinyl release and the CD released in 2001 were sold with a small pair of 3D glasses with which to view it.

Track listing
All tracks written by Nile Rodgers, except where stated.
Side A
"Plan-9"  - 4:16 (Nile Rodgers, Jimmy Bralower)
"State Your Mind"  - 5:47 (Martin Celay)
"The Face In The Window"  - 4:17 (Eric Lowen, Rick Boston, Dan Navarro)
"Doll Squad"  - 3:54
Side B
"Let’s Go Out Tonight"  - 5:19
"Groove Master"  - 4:42
"Wavelength"  - 3:53
"Stay Out Of The Light"  - 5:12

Personnel
 Nile Rodgers: Lead and backing vocals, guitars, keyboards 
 Alfa Anderson: lead and backing vocals
 Frank Simms, George Simms, David Spinner, Curtis King: backing vocals
 Tommy Jymi, Rob Sabino: keyboards
 Jimmy Bralower: Guitars, bass, drums

Production
Recorded and mixed at The Power Station and Atlantic Recording Studios, New York
 Nile Rodgers and Tommy “Rock” Jymi - producers 
 James Farber – recording and mix
 Eric Mahler – second engineer
 Bobby Warner, Malcolm Pollack, Josh Abbey – additional engineers
 Steve Rinkoff, Dave Greenberg, Ira McLaughlin, Dan Nash – additional second engineers
 Joe Sidore, Gus “Nan Desuka” Skinas – digital engineering
 Budd Tunnick, Kevin Jones – production managers
 Bob Ludwig, at Masterdisk - mastering

References

1985 albums
Nile Rodgers albums
Warner Records albums
Albums produced by Nile Rodgers